Inidhu Inidhu Kadhal Inidhu is a 2003 Indian Tamil-language romance film directed by Sakthi Chidambaram, and produced by Ramoji Rao. The film stars Jai Akash and Neha, with Hamsavardhan and Monica in supporting roles. The film, a remake of the successful 2001 Telugu film Anandam, released on 8 May 2003 to mixed reviews.

Cast

 Jai Akash as Sibi
 Neha Pendse as Mamathi
 Hamsavardhan as Ajay
 Monica as Deepika
 Nassar
 Livingston
 Vadivelu
 Karunas
 Pyramid Natarajan
 Thalaivasal Vijay
 Chitti Babu
 Singamuthu
 Bonda Mani
 Chaams
 Crane Manohar
 Simran in a guest appearance ("Naan Puttam Pudiyai")

Production
The venture was a remake of the Srinu Vaitla's successful 2001 Telugu film Anandam, with the lead actor Jai Akash retained in his role.

Soundtrack
Soundtrack was composed by Devi Sri Prasad, with lyrics written by Vairamuthu.

Release
This film has not been telecasted on any Tamil TV channels yet. The film opened to mixed reviews with a critic noting "Inidhu Inidhu Kaadhal Inidhu manages to stand out, even if only slightly, from the rest of the entries. The fact that the romance takes awhile to arrive and does so in an unexpected fashion gets this Telugu remake a few more points than the other romantic movies." Malathi Rangarajan of The Hindu revealed "the film drags on for 45 minutes — absolutely exasperating."

In 2013, Jai Akash announced that he was working towards directing a sequel to the film titled Anandam Aarambam and had cast a completely new team from the original however it was shelved.

References

2003 films
2000s Tamil-language films
2000s romance films
Tamil remakes of Telugu films
Indian buddy films
Indian romance films
2000s buddy films
Films directed by Sakthi Chidambaram